Cherepanovo is a rural locality (a village) in Vereshchaginsky District, Perm Krai, Russia.  The population was 8 as of 2010.

Geography 
Cherepanovo is located 28 km west of Vereshchagino (the district's administrative centre) by road. Shavrino is the nearest rural locality.

References 

Rural localities in Vereshchaginsky District